The 2019 Nauruan presidential election was the 31st presidential election in the Republic of Nauru. Incumbent president Baron Waqa was unable to run for re-election as he had lost his seat in the Parliament in the 2019 election, and thus a new president had to be elected. According to the Constitution of Nauru, the president is elected by the Parliament, and must also be a sitting member of the Parliament. Independent candidate Lionel Aingimea defeated Nauru First candidate David Adeang, with 12 and 6 votes respectively. The election was held in conjunction with the parliamentary elections of the same year.

Results

See also 
 Nauru
 2019 Nauruan parliamentary election
 2022 Nauruan presidential election

References 

Presidential elections in Nauru
Nauru
2019 in Nauru